KYDT (103.1 FM) is a radio station broadcasting a News Talk Information format. Licensed to Pine Haven, Wyoming, United States, it serves the Sundance, Wyoming and Belle Fourche, South Dakota region of the Black Hills. It is currently owned by Ultimate Caps, Inc. and features programming from ESPN Radio, Jones Radio Network and Westwood One.
The station broadcasts in mono instead of traditional FM stereo.

References

External links

Country radio stations in the United States
YDT
News and talk radio stations in the United States
Radio stations established in 1997
1997 establishments in Wyoming